Chile–Palestine relations refers to the current and historical relations between the Republic of Chile and the State of Palestine. Both nations enjoy friendly relations, the importance of which centers on the history of Palestinian migration to Chile.

History
In the late 1800s, Palestinians (initially young men) began arriving to Chile. Many were escaping conscription into the Ottoman Army. Over time, more Palestinians would arrive to Chile and work in various industries in the country, particularly the textile industry. In 1947, Chile abstained from voting in the United Nations Partition Plan for Palestine.

In 1990, the Palestine Liberation Organization (PLO) established an "Information Office" in Santiago. In 1994, with the formation of the Palestinian National Authority, the Information Office changed its category to a "Representation Office of Palestine in Chile". In April 1998, Chile was the first Latin American country to open a Representation Office to the Palestinian National Authority in Ramallah.

In January 2011, Chile recognized Palestine as an independent nation. A few months later, in March 2011, Chilean President Sebastián Piñera paid a visit to Palestine and visited Bethlehem and the city of Ramallah where he met President of the Palestinian National Authority, Mahmoud Abbas. During his visit, President Piñera also visited and laid a wreath on the tomb of Yasser Arafat. In May 2018, President Mahmoud Abbas paid a visit to Chile. During his visit, President Abbas and President Piñera discussed the Two-state solution to the Israeli–Palestinian conflict.

In June 2019, President Piñera paid a second visit to Palestine and traveled to East Jerusalem, Bethlehem and Ramallah where he met again with Mahmoud Abbas.

In December 2022, President Gabriel Boric announced the opening of an embassy of Chile in Palestine.

High-level visits

High-level visits from Chile to Palestine
 President Sebastián Piñera (2011, 2019)
 Deputy Foreign Minister Edgardo Riveros (2014)

High-level visits from Palestine to Chile
 Deputy Minister of Social Affairs Anwar Hamam (2015)
 Deputy Foreign Minister Tayser Farahat (2017)
 President of the Palestinian National Authority Mahmoud Abbas (2018)

Bilateral agreements
Both nations have signed a few agreements such as Memorandum of Understanding for Scientific, Technical, Cultural and Educational Cooperation (1996); Memorandum of Understanding between the Ministries of Health of Chile and the Palestinian National Authority, regarding health matters (2008); Memorandum of Understanding on Economic Cooperation (2011); Agreement on visa exemption for holders of diplomatic and official passports (2016); and a Memorandum of Understanding on Cultural Cooperation (2017).

Diaspora
There is a community of approximately 400,000 people of Palestinian origin in Chile which makes Chile having the largest Palestinian community outside of the Middle East.

Diplomatic missions

 Chile has a representative office in Ramallah.
 Palestine has an embassy in Santiago.

See also
 Foreign relations of Chile
 Foreign relations of Palestine
 Club Deportivo Palestino
 List of ambassadors of the State of Palestine to Chile
 Palestinian community in Chile

References 

 
Palestine
Chile